Marlene Dietrich (27 December 1901 – 6 May 1992) was a German and American actress and singer.

In the 1920s, she acted on the Berlin stage and in silent films, making her film debut in 1922. She was propelled to international fame by director Josef von Sternberg, who cast her as Lola-Lola in The Blue Angel (1930). The film's commercial success brought her a contract with Paramount Pictures in the United States.

Paramount sought to market Dietrich as a German answer to Metro-Goldwyn-Mayer's Swedish actress Greta Garbo. Her first American film, Morocco (1930), directed by Sternberg, earned Dietrich her only Academy Award nomination. She would appear in several other films directed by Sternberg, including Dishonored (1931), Blonde Venus (1932) and Shanghai Express (1932).

Dietrich and Sternberg's last two film collaborations, The Scarlet Empress (1934) and The Devil Is a Woman (1935)—the most styled of their collaborations—were their least successful at the box office. Her first sound film without Sternberg was 1933's The Song of Songs, directed by Rouben Mamoulian, although she and Sternberg would later work together another two times.

Without Sternberg, Dietrich—along with Joan Crawford, Mae West, Greta Garbo, Katharine Hepburn and others—was labeled "box office poison" after the film Knight Without Armour (1937) proved a box office failure. In 1939, however, her stardom was revived when she played a cowboy saloon girl in the Western comedy Destry Rides Again opposite James Stewart, singing "See What the Boys in the Back Room Will Have".

While Dietrich arguably never fully regained her former screen glory, she continued performing in films, including appearances for such distinguished directors as Billy Wilder, Alfred Hitchcock and Orson Welles, in successful films that included A Foreign Affair (1948), Stage Fright (1950), Witness for the Prosecution (1957), Touch of Evil (1958) and Judgment at Nuremberg (1961). Her final film appearance was as herself in the 1984 documentary Marlene.

In 1999, the American Film Institute named Dietrich as the ninth-greatest female star of classic Hollywood cinema.

Film

Silent feature films

Sound feature films

Short films

Television
Complete list of television appearances (excluding news footage):
 Unicef Gala (Düsseldorf, 1962): Guest Appearance
 Cirque d'hiver (Paris, 9 March 1963): Cameo as "Garcon de Piste"
 Deutsche-Schlager-Festspiele  (Baden-Baden, 1963): Guest Appearance
 Grand Gala du Disque (Edison Awards) (The Hague, 1963): Guest Appearance
 Galakväll pa Berns (Stockholm, 1963): Concert, with introduction by Karl Gerhardt and orchestra conducted by Burt Bacharach
 Royal Variety Performance (London, 4 November 1963): Guest Appearance
 The Stars Shine for Jack Hylton (London, 1965): Guest Appearance
 The Magic of Marlene (Melbourne, March 1968): Concert, with orchestra conducted by William Blezard.
 The 22nd Annual Tony Awards (New York, 21 April 1968): Acceptance Speech
 Guest Star Marlene Dietrich (Copenhagen – for Swedish Television, 1970): Interview
 I Wish You Love (An Evening with Marlene Dietrich) (London, 23 & 24 November 1972): Concert TV Special, with orchestra conducted by Stan Freeman.

Awards and nominations

References

External links
 
 
 

Actress filmographies
American filmographies
German filmographies
Filmography